The Irish Challenge is a golf tournament on the Challenge Tour. In 2021 it was held at Portmarnock Hotel & Golf Links. The first event was played in October 2015 and was won by Tom Murray who beat Nino Bertasio at the second hole of a sudden-death playoff, winning the first prize of €28,800. The 2019 event was reduced to 54 holes after the final was abandoned because of heavy rain. Emilio Cuartero and Oscar Lengdén were tied for the lead after three rounds and had a playoff at the par-3 17th hole. Cuartero won with a birdie at the third extra hole.

Winners

Notes

References

External links
Coverage on the Challenge Tour's official site

Challenge Tour events
Golf tournaments in the Republic of Ireland
Recurring sporting events established in 2015
2015 establishments in Ireland
Golf in Leinster
Sport in County Carlow